The Diège is a  long river in the Corrèze département, south central France. Its source is at Saint-Setiers, on the plateau de Millevaches, in the parc naturel régional de Millevaches en Limousin. It flows generally southeast.

Its main tributary is the Liège.

Communes along its course
This list is ordered from source to mouth: 
Corrèze: Saint-Setiers, Sornac, Bellechassagne, Saint-Germain-Lavolps, Saint-Pardoux-le-Vieux, Chaveroche, Ussel, Mestes, Saint-Exupéry-les-Roches, Chirac-Bellevue, Saint-Victour, Margerides, Saint-Étienne-la-Geneste, Sainte-Marie-Lapanouze, Roche-le-Peyroux, Saint-Julien-près-Bort,

References

Rivers of France
Rivers of Corrèze
Rivers of Nouvelle-Aquitaine